Delfino Pescara 1936, commonly referred to as Pescara, is a professional Italian football club based in Pescara, Abruzzo.

The club was formed in 1936 and currently plays in Serie C. Pescara has competed in seven seasons in Serie A, 1977–78, 1979–80, 1987–88, 1988–89, 1992–93, 2012–13 and last participated in 2016–17. The team's official colors are white and light blue varied between either azure or sky blue, manifested in striped shirts with white socks and shorts.

History
Aside from a spell in Serie B in the 1940s, Pescara had a relatively undistinguished history until promotion to Serie B in 1974. With players like Giorgio Repetto and Bruno Nobili in the midfield, they managed to win their first promotion to Serie A in 1977 after winning the promotion play-off, but ultimately finished their first season in Serie A in last place. A second promotion after a play-off followed, but once more they would be relegated from the top flight and then descended to Serie C1 within two years.

Nonetheless, after returning to Serie B after a year, Pescara would enjoy a revival after the appointment of Giovanni Galeone as coach in 1986. His philosophy of attacking football saw the Biancazzurri promoted to Serie A as champions in 1987, where they lasted two years with players such as Júnior and Blaž Slišković among the club's star players. Galeone would return during the 1990–91 season and oversaw another promotion the following year.

After relegation, Pescara remained in Serie B side throughout the 1990s, narrowly missing promotion in 1999. Relegation to C1 followed in 2001, with promotion in 2003 being followed by two revoked relegations in a row due to bankruptcy and scandals affecting other clubs. Pescara was ultimately relegated in the 2006–07 season, with three presidential and managerial changes during the season. In December 2008, the debt-ridden club was legally declared out of business and its control passed to a bankruptcy trustee appointed by the Court of Pescara. In February 2009, a takeover from a group named Delfino Pescara 1936 was finalized with Deborah Caldora becoming the first woman to serve as chairman of the club. In the meantime, results did not improve significantly and in March, Giuseppe Galderisi was dismissed from the head coaching post with Antonello Cuccureddu being appointed as the new boss.

At the beginning of the 2009–10 season, Eusebio Di Francesco was appointed as the new coach. Pescara finished second in Girone B of Lega Pro Prima Divisione and qualified for the promotional play-offs. They defeated Reggiana in the semi-final and Verona in the final and subsequently returned to Serie B after a three-year absence. The following season started with the appointment of Zdeněk Zeman as new head coach; the Czech manager immediately brought Pescara back into national coverage thanks to his well-known all-attacking playing style that turned out to match perfectly with promising youngsters such as Marco Verratti with loanees Ciro Immobile and Lorenzo Insigne, who guided the squad to promotion to Serie A. Pescara secured promotion to the top-level after a 19-year absence after defeating Sampdoria with a 3–1 score in an away match on 20 May 2012. In the last minute of the final game of the regular season, Pescara striker Riccardo Maniero netted the winner in a match against Nocerina to claim Pescara's second Serie B title after Torino's draw away to AlbinoLeffe.

Pescara's 2012–13 campaign in Serie A – after losing Zeman, Verratti, Immobile and Insigne – ended with relegation back to the second tier. Three years later, under World Cup winner Massimo Oddo, the team returned to Serie A with a 3–1 aggregate win over Trapani in the playoff final. Zeman returned in February 2017 to the team, who again lasted just one year at the top before being relegated in last place.

In August 2018, Pescara launched a public mini-bond investment opportunity via sports investment platform Tifosy to raise a minimum of €2,000,000. The investment scheme raised a total of €2,300,000 to develop the club's youth sector and facilities.

Following an online competition to ease children's boredom during the coronavirus lockdown, the team adopted six-year-old Luigi D'Agostino's shirt design for the 2020 season.

After a poor 2020-21 campaign, the side were relegated to Serie C, the third tier of Italian football.

Supporters
One of Pescara's main rivals is Bari.

Players

Current squad

Out on loan

Coaching staff

Managerial history

Honours
 Serie B
Champions (2): 1986–87, 2011–12
 Serie C
Champions (1): 1973–74,
 Serie D
Champions (1): 1972–73,

Divisional movements

• Forerunner red-blue AC Pescara (1932–1935) included

References

External links
  
Soccerway Profile
ESPN Profile 

 
Football clubs in Abruzzo
Association football clubs established in 1936
Serie A clubs
Serie B clubs
Serie C clubs
Serie D clubs
1936 establishments in Italy
Delfino Pescara 1936